A Barraca is a Portuguese theatre company founded 1975 and directed by Hélder Costa and leading actress Maria do Céu Guerra.
It is based at the Teatro Cinearte on 2 Largo de Santos, Lisbon.

History

The company was founded in 1975 by actress and stage director Maria do Céu Guerra and director Mario Alberto. 
It belonged to an emerging movement of experimental independent theater companies located mainly in Lisbon.
During 1976 the group spent most of its time touring the country.
The Europa Year Book of 1983 listed it as one of the main Portuguese theater companies of the period following the Carnation Revolution of 25 April 1974.  
The group was described at the time as the most popular of the independent theater companies in Portugal.

Maria do Céu Guerra and stage director and playwright Hélder Costa have managed the company since its foundation.
Costa has written, transcribed and staged many of the shows presented by the group.
During his time of exile in Lisbon, the Brazilian playwright Augusto Boal participated in directing the company.
He left a strong influence on the group's repertoire. 
The actor Mário Viegas first appeared with the company.

In 1976 the company moved to precarious facilities at the top of Rua Alexandre Herculano, near the Largo do Rato. 
In 1989 they were granted the Cinearte theater in Largo de Santos by the Lisbon City Council for a period of 25 years.
The theater was also used as a cafe-concert space.

On 4 March 2011 the theater group celebrated 35 years with a party that feted two of the leading figures in its history, Augusto Boal and the actress Fernanda Alves.
Rita Lello put on a special staging of the play Angel City by Sam Shepard.

Theatrical productions

The theatrical productions of A Barraca are mainly adaptations of historical and political subjects to the popular, traditional and modern format of narrative theater. 
The company has a special focus on national production, due to the subsidies allocated to it by the state.

A Barraca debuted in March 1976 in the Incrível Almadense theater with Cidade Dourada (Golden City) by La Candelária. 
This was a great success.
In September of that year it mounted the show  (Stories of Squires and Pimps) staged by Hélder Costa and based on scripts by Gil Vicente and Ruzante.
In 1977 it presented the show Ao qu'isto chegou! - Feira portuguesa de opinião, including the drama A Lei É a Lei (The Law is the Law) by Luiz Francisco Rebello.
When Augusto Boal was with the company in 1977–78 he directed three plays including Barraca conta Tiradentes (1977). 
In 1978 the company presented the piece José do Telhado about the famous Portuguese villain José do Telhado, with musical arrangements by Zeca Afonso.
The music was released in 1979 as the album Fura, Fura.

A Barraca produced some of its greatest successes in the 1980s.
In 1980 it presented É menino ou menina? (Is it a boy or girl?), a collage of pieces by Gil Vicente arranged by Maria do Céu Guerra and directed by Helder Costa. 
The company made an interesting contribution to the history of representations of works by Gil Vicente.
In the same year the group first visited Brazil.
It showed Preto no branco, a version of Accidental Death of an Anarchist by Dario Fo. 
The repertoire also included D. João VI by Hélder Costa. Mário Viegas played the sovereign and caused much amusement by his interpretation of the king as a chicken eater, who walked around with pieces of poultry in his pockets.

The group was described as a "large international theater company" during its limited engagement in Rio de Janeiro.
In 1983 the company presented Um dia na capital do Império (One day in the capital of the Empire), with a script by António Ribeiro Chiado and staging by Hélder Costa.
In 1984 A Barraca produced Santa Joana dos Matadouros (Saint Joan of the Stockyards) by Bertolt Brecht, considered one of the greatest successes of the company, and in 1986 produced Calamity Janes, with a highly acclaimed interpretation by Maria do Céu Guerra.

In September 2010 A Barraca was asked to re-enact the play O Mistério da Camioneta Fantasma (The Mystery of the Phantom Coach) as part of the official program for the Centenary Celebration of the Republic.
On 20 July 2011 the group debuted the production D. Maria, a Louca (Maria the Mad), with script by the Brazilian author António Cunha and staging by Maria do Céu Guerra.
On 10 April 2013 the A Barraca company debuted Menino de Sua Avó (His Grandmother's Boy), an unpublished text by the playwright Armando Nascimento Rosa, a creation of Maria do Céu Guerra and Adérito Lopes. 
This production was included in the closing celebrations of the Year of Portugal in Brazil, performed in the Teatro Dulcina in Rio de Janeiro on 3, 4 and 5 May 2013 .

Presentations
Many of the productions of the company have been Hélder Costa's own plays:
 Zé do Telhado
 Príncipe de Spandau
 D. João VI
 Damião de Góis
 As Peúgas de Einstein

References

Sources

External links

 Official website of A Barraca 

Theatres in Lisbon
Entertainment companies of Portugal